The following is the List of the Catholic dioceses in Italy. , the Catholic Church in Italy is divided into sixteen ecclesiastical regions. While they are similar to the 20 civil regions of the Italian state, there are some differences. Most ecclesiastical regions are in turn divided into a number of ecclesiastical provinces. The provinces are in turn divided into a number of dioceses. The sovereign state of Vatican City is part of the metropolitan province of Rome. A metropolitan bishop exercises a degree of leadership over a group of dioceses that are loosely subject (suffragan) to the care of the metropolitan see. This list excludes those archdioceses, dioceses and ecclesiastical territories that are immediately subject to the Holy See.

There are 227 sees ('particular churches'), most of which are dioceses led by a bishop. A diocese that is led by an archbishop is known as an archdiocese. There are 40 Metropolitan archdioceses which serve as the seat of an ecclesiastical province. This number includes the Holy See and the Patriarchate of Venice. There are also four archdioceses which are non-metropolitan, having been demoted by papal decree. This brings the number of archbishops in Italy and Vatican City to 44 (i.e. 40 + 4).

All the sees belong to the Latin Church apart from three Eastern Catholic sees of the Italo-Albanian Catholic Church that use the Byzantine Rite in the Albanian language. All sees of the Latin Church use the Roman Rite apart from the Metropolitan Archdiocese of Milan, which mainly uses the Ambrosian Rite.

Episcopal Conference of Italy

Exempt 

The following are immediately Subject to the Holy See, despite not being in the Pope's Ecclesiastical Province of Rome.

 non-Metropolitan Archdiocese of Lucca  
 non-Metropolitan Archdiocese of Spoleto-Norcia
 Diocese of Orvieto-Todi
 Diocese of Terni-Narni-Amelia
 Territorial Abbey of Monte Oliveto Maggiore
 Military Ordinariate of Italy
 Personal Prelature of Opus Dei

Italo-Albanian Catholic Church 
(Byzantine Rite, the only non-Latin dioceses in Italy)
 Eparchy of Lungro 
 Eparchy of Piana degli Albanesi 
 Territorial Abbacy of Santa Maria of Grottaferrata

Ecclesiastical Region of Abruzzo-Molise 
The ecclesiastical provinces of L'Aquila, Chieti-Vasto and Pescara-Penne are mainly situated in the civil region of Abruzzo while Campobasso-Boiano is situated in Molise.

Ecclesiastical Province of L'Aquila 
Archdiocese of L'Aquila
Diocese of Avezzano
Diocese of Sulmona-Valva

Ecclesiastical Province of Chieti-Vasto 
 Metropolitan Archdiocese of Chieti-Vasto
Archdiocese of Lanciano-Ortona

Ecclesiastical Province of Pescara-Penne 
Archdiocese of Pescara-Penne
Diocese of Teramo-Atri

Ecclesiastical Province of Campobasso-Boiano 
 Metropolitan Archdiocese of Campobasso-Boiano
Diocese of Isernia-Venafro
Diocese of Termoli-Larino
Diocese of Trivento

Ecclesiastical Region of Basilicata

Ecclesiastical Province of Potenza-Muro Lucano-Marsico Nuovo 
Archdiocese of Potenza-Muro Lucano-Marsico Nuovo
Archdiocese of Acerenza
Archdiocese of Matera-Irsina
Diocese of Melfi-Rapolla-Venosa
Diocese of Tricarico
Diocese of Tursi-Lagonegro

Ecclesiastical Region of Calabria

Ecclesiastical Province of Reggio Calabria-Bova 
Archdiocese of Reggio Calabria-Bova
Diocese of Locri-Gerace 
Diocese of Mileto-Nicotera-Tropea
Diocese of Oppido Mamertina-Palmi

Ecclesiastical Province of Catanzaro-Squillace 
 Metropolitan Archdiocese of Catanzaro-Squillace
Archdiocese of Crotone-Santa Severina
Diocese of Lamezia Terme

Ecclesiastical Province of Cosenza-Bisignano 
 Metropolitan Archdiocese of Cosenza-Bisignano
Archdiocese of Rossano-Cariati
Diocese of Cassano all'Jonio
Diocese of San Marco Argentano-Scalea

Ecclesiastical Region of Campania

Ecclesiastical Province of Salerno-Campagna-Acerno 
 Metropolitan Archdiocese of Salerno-Campagna-Acerno
Archdiocese of Amalfi-Cava de' Tirreni
Diocese of Nocera Inferiore-Sarno
Diocese of Teggiano-Policastro
Diocese of Vallo della Lucania
Territorial Abbey of Santissima Trinità di Cava de' Tirreni

Ecclesiastical Province of Benevento 
 Metropolitan Archdiocese of Benevento
Archdiocese of Sant'Angelo dei Lombardi-Conza-Nusco-Bisaccia
Diocese of Ariano Irpino-Lacedonia
Diocese of Avellino
Diocese of Cerreto Sannita-Telese-Sant’Agata de’ Goti
Territorial Abbey of Montevergine

Ecclesiastical Province of Naples 
 Metropolitan Archdiocese of Naples
Archdiocese of Capua
Archdiocese of Sorrento-Castellammare di Stabia
Diocese of Acerra
Diocese of Alife-Caiazzo
Diocese of Aversa
Diocese of Caserta
Diocese of Ischia
Diocese of Nola
Diocese of Pozzuoli
Diocese of Sessa Aurunca
Diocese of Teano-Calvi
Territorial Prelature of Pompei o Beatissima Vergine Maria del SS.mo Rosario

Ecclesiastical Region of Emilia-Romagna

Ecclesiastical Province of Bologna 
 Metropolitan Archdiocese of Bologna
Archdiocese of Ferrara-Comacchio
Diocese of Faenza-Modigliana
Diocese of Imola

Ecclesiastical Province of Modena-Nonantola 
 Metropolitan Archdiocese of Modena-Nonantola
Diocese of Carpi
Diocese of Fidenza
Diocese of Parma
Diocese of Piacenza-Bobbio
Diocese of Reggio Emilia-Guastalla

Ecclesiastical Province of Ravenna-Cervia 
Archdiocese of Ravenna-Cervia
Diocese of Cesena-Sarsina
Diocese of Forli-Bertinoro
Diocese of Rimini
Diocese of San Marino-Montefeltro

Ecclesiastical Region of Lazio

Ecclesiastical Province of Rome 

Diocese of Rome
Suburbicarian See of Albano
Suburbicarian See of Frascati
Suburbicarian See of Palestrina
Suburbicarian See of Porto-Santa Rufina
Suburbicarian See of Sabina-Poggio Mirteto
Suburbicarian See of Velletri-Segni
Archdiocese of Gaeta
Diocese of Anagni-Alatri
Diocese of Civita Castellana
Diocese of Civitavecchia-Tarquinia
Diocese of Frosinone-Veroli-Ferentino
Diocese of Latina-Terracina-Sezze-Priverno
Diocese of Rieti
Diocese of Sora-Aquino-Pontecorvo
Diocese of Tivoli
Diocese of Viterbo
Territorial Abbey of Montecassino
Territorial Abbey of Subiaco

Ecclesiastical Region of Liguria

Ecclesiastical Province of Genoa 
 Metropolitan Archdiocese of Genoa
Diocese of Albenga-Imperia
Diocese of Chiavari
Diocese of La Spezia-Sarzana-Brugnato
Diocese of Savona-Noli
Diocese of Tortona
Diocese of Ventimiglia-San Remo

Ecclesiastical Region of Lombardy

Ecclesiastical Province of Milan 
Metropolitan Archdiocese of Milan
Diocese of Bergamo
Diocese of Brescia
Diocese of Como
Diocese of Crema
Diocese of Cremona
Diocese of Lodi
Diocese of Mantua
Diocese of Pavia
Diocese of Vigevano

Ecclesiastical Region of Marche

Ecclesiastical Province of Ancona-Osimo 
 Metropolitan Archdiocese of Ancona-Osimo
Diocese of Fabriano-Matelica
Diocese of Jesi
Diocese of Senigallia
Territorial Prelature of Loreto

Ecclesiastical Province of Fermo 
 Metropolitan Archdiocese of Fermo
Archdiocese of Camerino-San Severino Marche
Diocese of Ascoli Piceno
Diocese of Macerata-Tolentino-Recanati-Cingoli-Treia
Diocese of San Benedetto del Tronto-Ripatransone-Montalto

Ecclesiastical Province of Pesaro 
 Metropolitan Archdiocese of Pesaro
Archdiocese of Urbino-Urbania-Sant'Angelo in Vado
Diocese of Fano-Fossombrone-Cagli-Pergola

Ecclesiastical Region of Piedmont

Ecclesiastical Province of Turin 
 Metropolitan Archdiocese of Turin
Diocese of Acqui
Diocese of Alba Pompeia
Diocese of Aosta
Diocese of Asti
Diocese of Cuneo
Diocese of Fossano
Diocese of Ivrea
Diocese of Mondovi
Diocese of Pinerolo
Diocese of Saluzzo
Diocese of Susa

Ecclesiastical Province of Vercelli 
 Metropolitan Archdiocese of Vercelli
Diocese of Alessandria della Paglia
Diocese of Biella
Diocese of Casale Monferrato
Diocese of Novara

Ecclesiastical Region of Puglia

Ecclesiastical Province of Bari-Bitonto 
 Metropolitan Archdiocese of Bari-Bitonto
Archdiocese of Trani-Barletta-Bisceglie
Diocese of Altamura-Gravina-Acquaviva delle Fonti
Diocese of Andria
Diocese of Conversano-Monopoli
Diocese of Molfetta-Ruvo-Giovinazzo-Terlizzi

Ecclesiastical Province of Foggia-Bovino 
 Metropolitan Archdiocese of Foggia-Bovino
Archdiocese of Manfredonia-Vieste-S. Giovanni Rotondo
Diocese of Cerignola-Ascoli Satriano
Diocese of Lucera-Troia
Diocese of San Severo

Ecclesiastical Province of Lecce 
 Metropolitan Archdiocese of Lecce
Archdiocese of Brindisi-Ostuni
Archdiocese of Otranto
Diocese of Nardò-Gallipoli
Diocese of Ugento-Santa Maria di Leuca

Ecclesiastical Province of Taranto 
 Metropolitan Archdiocese of Taranto
Diocese of Castellaneta
Diocese of Oria

Ecclesiastical Region of Sardinia

Ecclesiastical Province of Cagliari 
 Metropolitan Archdiocese of Cagliari
Diocese of Iglesias
Diocese of Lanusei
Diocese of Nuoro

Ecclesiastical Province of Oristano 
 Metropolitan Archdiocese of Oristano
Diocese of Ales-Terralba

Ecclesiastical Province of Sassari 
 Metropolitan Archdiocese of Sassari
Diocese of Alghero-Bosa
Diocese of Ozieri
Diocese of Tempio-Ampurias

Ecclesiastical Region of Sicily

Ecclesiastical Province of Agrigento 
 Metropolitan Archdiocese of Agrigento
Diocese of Caltanissetta
Diocese of Piazza Armerina

Ecclesiastical Province of Catania 
 Metropolitan Archdiocese of Catania
Diocese of Acireale
Diocese of Caltagirone

Ecclesiastical Province of Messina-Lipari-Santa Lucia del Mela 
 Metropolitan Archdiocese of Messina-Lipari-Santa Lucia del Mela
Diocese of Nicosia
Diocese of Patti

Ecclesiastical Province of Palermo 
 Metropolitan Archdiocese of Palermo
Archdiocese of Monreale
Diocese of Cefalu 
Diocese of Mazara del Vallo 
Diocese of Trapani

Ecclesiastical Province of Siracusa (Syracuse) 
 Metropolitan Archdiocese of Siracusa
Diocese of Noto
Diocese of Ragusa

Ecclesiastical Region of Tuscany

Ecclesiastical Province of Firenze (Florence) 

 Metropolitan Archdiocese of Florence
Diocese of Arezzo-Cortona-Sansepolcro
Diocese of Fiesole
Diocese of Pistoia
Diocese of Prato
Diocese of San Miniato

Ecclesiastical Province of Pisa 
Archdiocese of Pisa
Diocese of Livorno
Diocese of Massa Carrara-Pontremoli
Diocese of Pescia
Diocese of Volterra

Ecclesiastical Province of Siena-Colle di Val d'Elsa-Montalcino 
 Metropolitan Archdiocese of Siena-Colle di Val d'Elsa-Montalcino
Diocese of Grosseto
Diocese of Massa Marittima-Piombino
Diocese of Montepulciano-Chiusi-Pienza
Diocese of Pitigliano-Sovana-Orbetello

Ecclesiastical Region of Triveneto 
In the ecclesiastical region of Triveneto, there are two ecclesiastical provinces of that are situated in the civil region of Friuli-Venezia Giulia (Gorizia and Udine); one province that is mainly situated in the civil region of Trentino-Alto Adige/Südtirol (Trento); one province that is mainly situated in the civil region of Veneto (Venice).

Ecclesiastical Province of Gorizia 
 Metropolitan Archdiocese of Gorizia
Diocese of Trieste

Ecclesiastical Province of Udine 
 Metropolitan Archdiocese of Udine

Ecclesiastical Province of Trento 
 Metropolitan Archdiocese of Trento
Diocese of Bolzano-Brixen

Ecclesiastical Province of Venice 
 Patriarchate (& Metropolitan Archdiocese) of Venice
Diocese of Adria-Rovigo
Diocese of Belluno-Feltre
Diocese of Chioggia
Diocese of Concordia-Pordenone
Diocese of Padua
Diocese of Treviso
Diocese of Verona
Diocese of Vicenza
Diocese of Vittorio Veneto

Ecclesiastical Region of Umbria

Ecclesiastical Province of Perugia-Città della Pieve 
 Metropolitan Archdiocese of Perugia-Città della Pieve
Diocese of Assisi-Nocera Umbra-Gualdo Tadino
Diocese of Città di Castello
Diocese of Foligno
Diocese of Gubbio

Former prelatures

Titular Prelatures 
 Titular Archiepiscopal Sees : 
 Metropolitan : Patriarchate of Aquileia, Patriarchate of Grado
 other : Archdiocese of Gradisca
 Titular Episcopal Sees (158): Acquapendente, Æca, Agropoli, Alessano, Altino, Amiterno, Anglona, Anzio, Aquaviva, Arna, Arpi, Asolo, Atella, Aveia, Bagnoregio, Belcastro, Bettona, Bevagna, Biccari, Bisarcio, Bitetto, Blanda, Blera, Bolsena, Bomarzo, Brescello, Buxentum, Campli, Canne, Canosa, Caorle, Capo della Foresta, Capri, Carini, Carinola, Carmeiano, Castello, Castro, Castro di Puglia, Castro di Sardegna, Caudium, Celano, Cerenzia, Cerveteri, Città Ducale, Civitanova, Civitate, Claterna, Cuma, Dolia, Dragonara, Eclano, Egnazia Appula, Equilio, Eraclea, Erdonia, Faleri, Falerone, Ferento, Fidene, Fiorentino, Fondi, Forconio, Fordongianus, Forlimpopoli, Formia, Foro Flaminio, Frigento, Gabi, Galazia in Campania, Gallese, Galtellì, Grumentum, Guardialfiera, Isola, Labico, Lavello, Lentini, Lesina, Lettere, Lilibeo, Lorium, Luni, Malamocco, Martana, Martirano, Massa Lubrense, Minervino Murge, Minori, Minturno, Miseno, Montecorvino, Montefiascone, Montemarano, Monterano, Monteverde, Mottola, Nepi, Nomento, Numana, Oderzo, Ofena, Orte, Ostra, Otricoli, Ottana, Passo Corese, Pausula, Pesto, Plestia, Ploaghe, Polignano, Populonia, Potenza Picena, Ravello, Roselle, Sabiona, Sala Consilina, Salpi, San Leone, Santa Giusta, Satriano, Scala, Sepino, Sorres, Spello, Strongoli, Subaugusta, Suelli, Sulci, Sutri, Taormina, Tauriano, Termini Imerese, Tharros, Thurio, Tindari, Torcello, Tortiboli, Tre Taverne, Treba, Trevi, Trevi nel Lazio, Trevico, Tricala, Troina, Tronto, Tuscania, Umbriatico, Urbisaglia, Velia, Vescovìo, Vibo Valentia, Vico Equense, Voghenza, Volturno, Vulturara, Zuglio
 Titular Abbacies (?nullius) (all 10 united to current dioceses) : Farfa, Fontevivo, Nonantola, Pomposa, San Colombano, San Martino al Monte Cimino, San Michele Arcangelo di Montescaglioso, San Salvatore Maggiore, Santa Maria di Polsi, Santissimo Salvatore

Gallery of Archdioceses

See also 
 List of Catholic dioceses (structured view)
 List of cathedrals in Italy

Sources and external links 
 GCatholic - Italy
 GCatholic - Former and/or titular sees in Italy
 Catholic Hierarchy Profile of the Catholic Church in Italy

Roman Catholic dioceses
Italy